The 2018 German Open was the third event of the 2018 ITTF World Tour. It was the second of six top-tier Platinum events on the tour, and took place from 22–25 March in Bremen, Germany.

China's Ma Long won the men's singles title for a fifth time, making him the most successful player in the tournament's history.

Men's singles

Seeds

Draw

Top half

Bottom half

Finals

Women's singles

Seeds

Draw

Top half

Bottom half

Finals

Men's doubles

Seeds

Draw

Women's doubles

Seeds

Draw

References

External links
 Tournament page on ITTF website

German Open
2018 in German sport
German Open
German Open
Sport in Bremen (city)
German Open (table tennis)